Keeneland Association, Inc. is an equine business based in Lexington, Kentucky. It includes two distinct divisions: the Keeneland Race Course, a Thoroughbred racing facility, and Keeneland Sales, a horse auction complex. It is also known for its reference library.

In 2009, the Horseplayers Association of North America introduced a rating system for 65 Thoroughbred racetracks in North America.  Keeneland was ranked #1 of the top ten tracks. It is listed on the National Register of Historic Places and designated a National Historic Landmark in 1986.

History
It has used proceeds from races and its auctions to further the thoroughbred industry as well as to contribute to the surrounding community.

Keeneland Race Course has conducted live race meets in April and October since 1936. The 15-day spring meet is one of the richest in North America, with fifteen graded stakes races featuring the Blue Grass Stakes, a prep race for the Kentucky Derby. The 17-day fall meet features seventeen graded stakes races, six of which are Grade One events used as Breeders' Cup preps.

Keeneland takes pride in maintaining racing traditions; it was the last track in North America to broadcast race calls over its public-address system, not doing so until 1997. Most of the racing scenes of the 2003 movie Seabiscuit were shot at Keeneland, in part because of the track's "retro feel". Keeneland was also used in the 2005 movie Dreamer and the 2010 movie Secretariat for several key scenes, including the running of the Belmont Stakes where the horse completes the Triple Crown.

Nonetheless, Keeneland has adopted several innovations. In 1984 in preparation for a visit by Queen Elizabeth II, it built a trackside Winner's Circle and created the Queen Elizabeth II Challenge Cup Stakes. In 1985, it installed a turf course over which the Challenge Cup, as well as a number of other turf races, is now run. It reshaped the main track and replaced the dirt surface with the proprietary Polytrack surface over the summer of 2006 in time for its fall race meeting.  The track was restored to a dirt racing surface during the summer of 2014.

Keeneland was designated a National Historic Landmark in 1986, for its role in the growth of the horseracing sport and its revitalization in Lexington.

Keeneland hosted the Breeders' Cup for the first time in 2015. The Breeders' Cup Classic was won by Triple Crown winner American Pharoah by six and a half lengths. He became the first to win the unofficial Grand Slam of horse racing; winning the Kentucky Derby, Preakness Stakes, Belmont Stakes and Breeders' Cup Classic. Many horse industry personnel were skeptical of Keeneland as a suitable venue because the track and town were too small to host such a large event. However it was a huge success and even had a Thoroughbred Daily News writer report "I was wrong...it was spectacular" and how he "couldn't be more impressed". In August 2018 Keeneland was named as the host of the 2020 Breeders' Cup.

In 2020 due to the COVID-19 pandemic in the United States, Keeneland cancelled their Spring meeting which was to be held from 2 April 2020 to 24 April 2020 and moved their meet to a shortened five day period from 8 July 2020 to 12 July 2020. Five stakes race were not scheduled: Bewitch Stakes, Ben Ali Stakes, Commonwealth Stakes, Doubledogdare Stakes and Lexington Stakes. The Breeders' Cup was won by Authentic, which had won the Kentucky Derby.

Keeneland Sales

Keeneland is the world's largest Thoroughbred auction house, conducting three sales annually:  The September Yearling Sale, November Breeding Stock Sale, and January Horses of All Ages Sale.  Horses sold at Keeneland sales include 82 horses that won 88 Breeders' Cup World Championship races; 19 Kentucky Derby winners; 21 Preakness winners; 18 Belmont winners; 11 recipients of the Eclipse Award as Horse of the Year; and five Epsom Derby winners. Graduates of Keeneland sales.  The Keeneland Team travels to over 25 countries and invests in over $700,000 annually towards international market development to deliver the world's deepest buying bench.  The auctions have sold horses to owners worldwide that have won large-scale races.  Nine of the 14 highest ranked horses in the Kentucky Oaks were sold in sales through Keeneland.

Layout

The track has a  dirt oval and a seven and one-half furlong turf oval. The turf course uses two configurations: the Keeneland Course setup has a temporary rail set  out, while the Haggin Course has no temporary rail.

TV personalities
Mike Battaglia (1974–present)
 Katie Mikolay Gensler (2013–present)

Keeneland Mark of Distinction

Since 1968 Keeneland has honored the contributions of individuals to both Keeneland itself and the Thoroughbred industry with the Mark of Distinction. Receipents of the honor are given a button that bears the colors of their racing or farm silks. Each spring and fall, members of the Keeneland Club wear the button.

Racing
Keeneland has two racing seasons: a Spring Meeting in April and a Fall Meeting in October. The following stakes races have been run at Keeneland, some with changing names and sponsorships over the years.

Grade 1 :
 Alcibiades Stakes
 Ashland Stakes
 Blue Grass Stakes
 Breeders' Futurity Stakes
 First Lady Stakes
 Jenny Wiley Stakes
 Keeneland Turf Mile Stakes
 Madison Stakes
 Maker's 46 Mile Stakes
 Queen Elizabeth II Challenge Cup Stakes 
 Spinster Stakes

Grade 2 :
 Appalachian Stakes 
 Elkhorn Stakes
 Fayette Stakes
 Jessamine Stakes
 Marathon Stakes
 Phoenix Stakes
 Raven Run Stakes
 Shakertown Stakes
 Thoroughbred Club of America Stakes
 Woodford Stakes

Grade 3 :

 Beaumont Stakes
 Ben Ali Stakes
 Bewitch Stakes
 Bourbon Stakes
 Bryan Station Stakes
 Franklin County Stakes
 Commonwealth Stakes
 Doubledogdare Stakes
 Dowager Stakes
  Lexington Stakes 
 Sycamore Stakes
 Transylvania Stakes
  Valley View Stakes

Non-graded stakes races
 Giant's Causeway Stakes

References

External links

 Official site
 Classic Race winners sold at Keeneland Auction
 Keeneland's First Meet, 1936

 
Kentucky culture
National Register of Historic Places in Lexington, Kentucky
National Historic Landmarks in Kentucky
Event venues on the National Register of Historic Places in Kentucky
1936 establishments in Kentucky
Sports venues on the National Register of Historic Places
Event venues established in 1936